Yeshiva University is a private Orthodox Jewish university with four campuses in New York City. The university's undergraduate schools—Yeshiva College, Stern College for Women, Katz School of Science and Health, and Syms School of Business—offer a dual curriculum inspired by Modern–Centrist–Orthodox Judaism's hashkafa (philosophy) of Torah Umadda ("Torah and secular knowledge"), combining academic education with the study of the Torah. While the majority of students at the university identify as Modern Orthodox, many students, especially at the Cardozo School of Law, the Syms School of Business, and the Ferkauf Graduate School of Psychology, are not Jewish.

Yeshiva University is an independent institution chartered by New York State. It is accredited by the Middle States Commission on Higher Education and by several professional agencies. It is classified among "Doctoral/Professional Universities".

History

Yeshiva University has its roots in the Etz Chaim Yeshiva founded in 1886 on the Lower East Side of Manhattan, a cheder-style elementary school founded by Eastern European immigrants that offered study of Talmud along with some secular education, including instruction in English. The rabbinical seminary was chartered in 1897.

In the 2020-2021 school year, Yeshiva University enrolled approximately 2,250 undergraduate students, and 2,700 graduate students. It is also home to affiliated high schools—Yeshiva University High School for Boys and Yeshiva University High School for Girls—and the Rabbi Isaac Elchanan Theological Seminary (RIETS). It conferred 1,822 degrees in 2007 and offers community service projects serving New York, Jewish communities, the United States and Canada. As of 2015, the university had run an operating deficit for seven consecutive years. In 2014, it lost $84 million, and in 2013, it suffered a loss of $64 million.

In 2012 the Middle States Commission on Higher Education warned the university "that its accreditation may be in jeopardy because of insufficient evidence that the institution is currently in compliance with Standard 10 (Faculty) and Standard 14 (Assessment of Student Learning)." On June 26, 2014, the Middle State Commission on Higher Education, which accredits the university "reaffirmed accreditation", but requested a progress report "evidence that student learning assessment information is used to improve teaching and learning." This was accepted by the commission on November 17, 2016 (wherein the university met the minimum requirements for accreditation).

In January 2016, the university disclosed plans to cede almost half of its $1 billion endowment to the Albert Einstein College of Medicine, as the medical college enters a separate joint venture with Montefiore Health System.

Presidents
 Bernard Revel 1915–40
 Samuel Belkin, 1943–75
 Norman Lamm, 1976–2003
 Richard M. Joel, 2003–17 
 Ari Berman, 2017–present

Academics

Schools
The university's academic programs are organized into the following schools:
 Yeshiva College (Yeshiva University)
 Stern College for Women
 Katz School of Science and Health
 Syms School of Business
 Philip and Sarah Belz School of Jewish Music
 Rabbi Isaac Elchanan Theological Seminary
Rabbinical and cantorial ordination programs are organized into the Rabbi Isaac Elchanan Theological Seminary and the Belz School of Jewish Music.
 Graduate and professional schools
 Benjamin N. Cardozo School of Law
 Wurzweiler School of Social Work
 Azrieli Graduate School of Jewish Education and Administration
 Bernard Revel Graduate School of Jewish Studies
 Ferkauf Graduate School of Psychology

Rankings

The U.S. News & World Reports 2020 "America's Best Colleges" ranked Yeshiva University as the 97th best National University. In 2019, Yeshiva University's rank was at 80th. 

Yeshiva University's Cardozo School of Law was ranked number 52nd by U.S. News in 2022. Cardozo ranked high in US News law specialties in Dispute Resolution (4th) and Intellectual Property Law (8th) as of the 2023 rankings.

In 2019, Forbes ranked Yeshiva University as: No. 99 of all colleges in America, No. 77 in Private Colleges, No. 53 in Research Universities and No. 50 in the Northeast. Nationally, Yeshiva was ranked 140th by the Times Higher Education World University Rankings, and internationally it is ranked in the 200s by the Shanghai Jiao Tong University's Academic Ranking of World Universities and 359th in the world by the QS World University Rankings.

Campuses
The university's main campus, Wilf Campus, is located in the Washington Heights neighborhood of upper Manhattan. Yeshiva University's main office is located within the Wilf Campus, at 500 185th St. A 1928 plan to build a spacious Moorish Revival campus around several gardens and courtyards was canceled by the Great Depression of 1929 after only one building had been erected. Building continued after the Depression in modern style and by the acquisition of existing neighborhood buildings. 

Since it was founded in 1886, Yeshiva University has expanded to comprise some twenty colleges, schools, affiliates, centers, and institutions, with several affiliated hospitals and healthcare institutions. It has campuses and facilities in Manhattan (Washington Heights, Murray Hill, Greenwich Village), the Bronx, Queens, and Israel.

The Yeshiva University Museum is a teaching museum and the cultural arm of Yeshiva University. Founded in 1973, Yeshiva University Museum is AAMG accredited and aims to provide a window into Jewish culture around the world and throughout history through multi-disciplinary exhibitions and publications.

The university's building in Jerusalem, in the Bayit VeGan neighborhood, contains a branch of the rabbinical seminary and an office coordinating the S. Daniel Abraham Israel Program.

Student life
Student publications
The undergraduate university newspaper is The Commentator, and the newspaper for Stern College is The Observer. Law students at Cardozo also edit and publish five law journals. There are numerous other publications on a wide range of topics, both secular and religious, produced by the various councils and academic clubs, along with many official university publications and the university press. The call letters of the student radio station are WYUR, and it is currently an Internet-only station.

LGBTQ+ club controversy and lawsuit

Yeshiva University has been involved in legal proceedings since April 2021 after it blocked official recognition of a Pride Alliance club for undergraduate LGBTQ+ students and their allies.

Controversy over LGBTQ-supportive undergraduate groups has been ongoing since at least 2009, when students created a "Tolerance Club." Its  purpose was to promote acceptance of diversity of people within the Yeshiva University community. A founding member said that the group had "determined that the school’s lack of diversity has fostered significant insensitivity to those outside of the mainstream Y.U. culture" and aimed to address that issue. The group's members included undergraduates at both the men's and women's campuses. Although not organized to address LGBTQ issues specifically, the group's promotion of tolerance for sexual and gender diversity generated controversy on the Yeshiva University campus; the student newspaper reported that the administration quashed a panel discussion because they objected to one of the speakers, a gay Orthodox rabbi. This controversy came to a head when the Tolerance Club sponsored a panel discussion entitled "Being Gay in the Orthodox World" in December, 2009. Several hundred people attended this panel discussion. Numerous Jewish news sources covered the panel and the conflict that enveloped the Yeshiva campus in its wake, and the Tolerance Club disbanded in May 2010.

A decade later, in 2021, undergraduate students sued the university for refusing to recognize a new LGBTQ+ student group, YU Pride Alliance. The university has retained the pro-religious practice law firm Becket Law as its counsel. A New York court ruled in June 2022 that the university must recognize the undergraduate Pride Alliance. The university appealed to the U.S. Supreme Court in August 2022, and a temporary stay was issued by Justice Sotomayor. In a 5–4 decision the full court vacated the stay without prejudice, ruling the NY appeals process was incomplete and thus SCOTUS relief premature. In response, the university put all student clubs on hold in September 2022, pending resolution of their ongoing legal challenges.

YU-affiliated Cardozo School of Law and the Ferkauf Graduate School of Psychology have publicly supported their own students and voiced their disapproval of the University's discrimination and lawsuit. At Cardozo School of Law, there has long been an officially recognized LGBTQ+ student group, and the Graduate School of Psychology also publicly supports the LGBTQ members of their communities.

The university announced on October 24, 2022 that they approved "Kol Yisrael Areivim", a new LGBTQ student group. According to the university, this new group will be the "approved traditional Orthodox alternative to its current LGBTQ student group, the YU Pride Alliance". There is still a dispute with the Pride Alliance who claimed the university's action as a stunt and distraction.

Undergraduate clubs and activities
Student groups include the Yeshiva University Dramatics Society (YCDS), which puts on a performance each semester. A student-run group known as the Heights Initiative sponsors several outreach programs that work with the schools and organizations of the Washington Heights community. Student Government is run through YSU, YCSA, SOY-JSC, and SYMS. Additionally, these groups run community events like the annual Hanukkah Concert and a carnival celebrating Israeli Independence Day. 

The Yeshiva University Medical Ethics Society (MES) is an undergraduate student-run organization of Yeshiva University which was founded by students in the fall of 2005 with the help of the Center for the Jewish Future toward the goal of promoting education and awareness of Jewish medical ethics in the university itself and the community at large. In the first several years, the group hosted a program of on-campus lectures in the field of medical ethics and Halakha (Jewish law). They also host genetic testing events to help combat the high incidence of various genetic diseases in the Jewish community.

Athletics
Yeshiva University includes a number of NCAA Division III-level sports teams. The teams, nicknamed "The Maccabees", include: men's baseball, basketball, golf, volleyball, wrestling, women's basketball, cross country, fencing, soccer, tennis, and volleyball.

Because of Yeshiva's dual curriculum, most of the sports teams practice at night, sometimes even as late as 11:00 pm. A few of the sports teams practice or work out before classes begin at 9:00 am; for example, the men's basketball team routinely practices at 6:00 am.

Teams have participated in weekend tournaments outside of New York City, with athletes staying with local families in the area. This took place in Boston with the basketball and fencing teams, and in Hollywood, Florida with the baseball team in 2008. Some international students have participated in NCAA sports, with as many as nine different nationalities representing the school on the sports field.

Baseball
Two members of the Yeshiva Maccabees Baseball team were drafted out of college by professional teams of the Israeli Baseball League. Pitcher Aryeh Rosenbaum celebrated a championship with his team in the IBL's first year.

Basketball
Yeshiva's Men's Basketball team is an annual playoff contender. The most successful eras for Yeshiva basketball in recent history have been at the start and end of the 1990s, as well as the dawn of the 2020s. Banners hang in the Max Stern Athletic Center commemorating seasons from both eras. The 2007–08 season had particular note as Yeshiva was home to the Skyline Conference's Rookie of the Year. In 2018, the team won the Skyline Conference title in a game against SUNY Purchase, earning its first-ever NCAA berth and considerable media coverage.Braziller, Z. (27 February 2018) The current head coach of the team is Elliot Steinmetz, who has been with the team since 2014.

In the 2019–20 season, the men's basketball team's only loss was in the season opener, with the Maccabees going on to win the Skyline Conference championship. This was the second time in three years that the Maccabees made the NCAA Division III Tournament. They won the first two rounds, pushing them into the Sweet Sixteen (3rd round) for the first time in school history. Before they played in the third round, the NCAA tournament was canceled due to COVID-19. After a 7–0 season in 2020–21 also abbreviated by COVID-19, the Maccabees entered the 2021–22 season on a 36-game winning streak, the longest current streak in NCAA men's basketball in any division, and were ranked #2 in the preseason by the Division III basketball website D3hoops.com. During this streak, the team has been featured by media outlets as diverse as ESPN, CNN, the New York Daily News, the Los Angeles Times, and The Wall Street Journal. After previous #1 Randolph–Macon lost in overtime, the Maccabees, with their winning streak having reached 44 games, inherited the #1 ranking in the D3hoops.com poll released on November 29, 2021, marking the first time any Yeshiva team had topped any national poll. The Maccabees received recognition from the ESPN and NBA Twitter accounts for their 50th straight win, the longest winning streak in NCAA Men's Division III Basketball.

As of December 29, 2021, the men's basketball team held the then-longest active winning streak in men's college basketball with 50 consecutive wins. On December 30, 2021, the men's basketball team lost their winning streak.

Fencing
One of the most successful teams in Yeshiva University sports history is the fencing team, known as the "Taubermen", named after the coach of the team, Professor Arthur Tauber, who served as the head coach of the team from 1949 through 1985. Olympic gold medalist Henry Wittenberg was at one time the coach of the wrestling team.

Tennis
In 2014, the Men's Tennis team won the Skyline Conference championship, becoming the first team in school history to advance to the NCAA tournament in any sport. In 2015, the Men's Tennis team repeated as Skyline Conference champions and went back to the NCAA National Tournament, advancing to the second round. They lost to the defending National Champions Amherst College. In 2016, the Men's Tennis team won the Skyline Conference a third year in a row and advancing to the NCAA D3 National Tennis Tournament again. The Men's Tennis team repeated as Skyline Conference champions in 2017 and 2018 to extend this streak of success to five consecutive NCAA National Tournament appearances.

Other sports
Since 2010, the Men's Cross Country and Men's Volleyball teams have won multiple championships. Many of the Maccabees have gained attention nationwide, like Sam Cohen won an individual championship as well as Capital One Academic honors. Other attention grabbers come from Women's Basketball and Women's Fencing.

 NCAA tournament appearances 

Men's Basketball: 2022 (NCAA Tournament First Round)
Men's Basketball: 2020 (NCAA Tournament Third Round)
Men's Basketball: 2018 (NCAA Tournament First Round)
Women's Tennis: 2018 (NCAA Tournament First Round)
Men's Tennis: 2018 (NCAA Tournament Second Round)
Men's Tennis: 2017 (NCAA Tournament Second Round)
Men's Tennis: 2016 (NCAA Tournament First Round)
Men's Tennis: 2015 (NCAA Tournament Second Round)
Men's Tennis: 2014 (NCAA Tournament First Round)

 Conference championships Women's Tennis2017 – Skyline Conference Champions
1999 – Skyline Conference Champions
1987 – IAC ChampionsWomen's Cross Country2013 – HVIAC ChampionsMen's Basketball2022 – Skyline Conference Champions
2020 – Skyline Conference Champions
2018 – Skyline Conference ChampionsMen's Tennis2018 – Skyline Conference Champions
2017 – Skyline Conference Champions
2016 – Skyline Conference Champions
2015 – Skyline Conference Champions
2014 – Skyline Conference Champions
1996 – IAC Champions
1995 – IAC ChampionsMen's Fencing1999 – Middle Atlantic College
1996 – IAC Champions
1995 – IAC ChampionsMen's Cross Country2014 – HVIAC Champions
2013 – HVIAC Champions
2012 – HVIAC Champions
2011 – HVIAC Champions
2010 – HVIAC ChampionsMen's Volleyball'
2015 – HVIAC Tournament Champions
2014 – HVIAC Tournament Champions
2013 – HVIAC Tournament Champions
2010 – HVIAC Tournament Champions

Notable alumni

 Real-estate developer and architect David Azrieli
 Professor of Hebrew Literature & Philosophy at Harvard Shaye J. D. Cohen (B.A. 1970)
 Former Vermont Governor Howard Dean (M.D. 1978)
 Judge Sandra J. Feuerstein, of the United States District Court for the Eastern District of New York (J.D. 1979)
 Restaurateur and writer Eddie Huang (J.D. 2008)
 Singer-songwriter Lucy Kaplansky
 Aaron Klein, author and chief strategist for Prime Minister Benjamin Netanyahu.
 Diplomat Daniel C. Kurtzer (B.A. 1971)
 New York Congresswoman Grace Meng (J.D.)
 Republican political strategist Nicolas Muzin
 Law professor A. Leo Levin at the University of Pennsylvania (B.A. 1939)
 Author Chaim Potok (B.A. 1950)
 Baseball executive David Samson (J.D. 1992)
 Rabbi and author Harold M. Schulweis (B.A. 1945)
 Comedian and podcaster Ari Shaffir
 Former Speaker of the New York State Assembly Sheldon Silver (B.A. 1978)
 Businessman Max Stern
 National Public Radio host Laura Sydell (J.D.)
 Democratic Party politician Herbert Tenzer
 Professional basketball player Ryan Turell (2022)
 President of the United Federation of Teachers Randi Weingarten (J.D. 1983)
 Pulitzer Prize-winning novelist Herman Wouk
 Triple Crown-winning racehorse owner Ahmed Zayat (B.A. 1983)

Notable staff

Adrienne Asch, biotethics scholar
 Paul Greengard, Nobel Prize winner
 Joe Lieberman, US Senator
Julius B. Maller, educator and sociologist
Oliver Sacks, British neurologist, naturalist, historian of science, and writer
Red Sarachek, basketball coach
 Joseph B. Soloveitchik, rabbi
 Telford Taylor, lawyer
Bob Tufts, Major League Baseball pitcher, taught sports marketing
Henry Wittenberg, Olympic champion in freestyle wrestling, taught wrestling
 Herman Wouk, author
James Yates, judge

See also

 List of Jewish universities and colleges in the United States
Orthodox Judaism
Bar-Ilan University
Hebrew Theological College
Jerusalem College of Technology
Lander College for Men

References

External links
Official website
 

 
Orthodox Jewish universities and colleges
Universities and colleges in New York City
Washington Heights, Manhattan
Educational institutions established in 1886
Jewish seminaries
1886 establishments in New York (state)
Private universities and colleges in New York City
Moorish Revival architecture in New York City
Jewish universities and colleges in the United States